Mud Lake is a lake in South Bruce Peninsula, Bruce County in southwestern Ontario, Canada.

The lake has one unnamed inflow at the northeast. The primary outflow is an unnamed creek at the southwest which flows to Isaac Lake on the Rankin River, which in turn flows via the Sauble River to Lake Huron.

See also
List of lakes in Ontario

References

Lakes of Bruce County